Sunlight is an album by keyboardist Herbie Hancock. It features Hancock's vocals through a Sennheiser VSM-201 vocoder, as well as performances by drummer Tony Williams and bassist Jaco Pastorius on one track.

Track listing 
All tracks composed by Herbie Hancock, except where indicated.

Side one
 "I Thought It Was You" (Hancock, Melvin Ragin, Jeffrey Cohen) – 8:56
 "Come Running to Me" (lyrics: Allee Willis) – 8:25

Side two
"Sunlight" – 7:12
"No Means Yes" – 6:21
"Good Question" – 8:32

Personnel

Musicians
 Herbie Hancock – keyboards, synthesizers, lead and background vocals (through vocoder) (1–3), string, brass and woodwind arrangements
 Patrick Gleeson – additional synthesizers (5)
 Bennie Maupin – soprano saxophone solo (3)
 Wah Wah Watson, Ray Parker Jr. – guitar (1, 3)
 Byron Miller (1), Paul Jackson (2–4), Jaco Pastorius (5) – electric bass
 Leon "Ndugu" Chancler (1), James Levi (2, 3), Harvey Mason, Sr. (4), Tony Williams (5) – drums
 Raul Rekow (exc. 3), Bill Summers (exc. 1) – percussion
 Baba Duru – tabla (2)
 Bobby Shew, Maurice Spears, Robert O'Bryant, Garnett Brown – brass (exc. 4)
 Ernest J. Watts, Fred Jackson, Jr., Jack Nimitz, David Willard Riddles – woodwind (2, 5)
 Terry Adams, Roy Malan, Nathan Rubin, Linda Wood, Emily VanValkenburgh – strings (2)

Production
 Herbie Hancock and David Rubinson – producers
 David Rubinson, Fred Catero (with Chris Minto and Cheryl Ward) – engineers at The Automatt
 Steve Mantoani – engineer at Different Fur Trading Co.
 Terry Becker – assistant engineer (brass)
 Phill Brown – mastering

References

External links
 

1978 albums
Herbie Hancock albums
Albums produced by Dave Rubinson
Columbia Records albums